Robert Pasemann (14 December 1886 – 6 October 1968), was a German track and field athlete who competed in the 1912 Summer Olympics. He was born in Charlottenburg, Berlin and died in Hanover. Pasemann was educated as a civil engineer, but worked as a sports teacher. He was one of the first German vegetarian athletes.

Pasemann was nominated for the 1908 London Olympics as a long jumper and gymnast, but broke his arms shortly before the Games and could not compete. This led to Pasemann's track and field career. In 1912 he finished eighth in the long jump competition and eleventh in the pole vault event.

Pasemann held several German titles set 19 German records in field events.

References

External links
 

1886 births
1968 deaths
German male long jumpers
German male pole vaulters
Olympic athletes of Germany
Athletes (track and field) at the 1912 Summer Olympics
Sportspeople from Kiel